The Three Must-Get-Theres is a 1922 American silent film directed by Max Linder. The film follows the plot of the 1844 novel The Three Musketeers by Alexandre Dumas. It is also meant as a parody of the previously released 1921 film The Three Musketeers, starring Douglas Fairbanks.

This was Linder's final American film before returning to Europe where he co-directed his last completed film in Austria, Max, der Zirkuskönig (Max, King of the Circus).

Plot summary
Dart-In-Again, a young and poor nobleman from Gascony travels to Paris hoping to become one of the King's musketeers. When he first encounter three musketeers, Walrus, Octopus and Porpoise, he starts duelling with them but rapidly becomes their friend. Together they fight the guards of Li'l Cardinal Richie-Loo, main Minister of King Louis XIII.

Queen Ann is desperate because the Cardinal has discovered that she has given the jewels offered to her by the King to her lover Lord Duke Poussy Bunkumin. Dart-In-Again crosses the English Channel on his sailing horse to recover them and returns them to the Queen just in time to save her honour. In the course of his adventures, he falls in love with Constance Bonne-aux-Fieux. The King rewards Dart-In-Again by appointing him as a musketeer and celebrates his wedding with Constance.

Cast 
Max Linder as Dart-In-Again
Bull Montana as Li'l Cardinal Richie-Loo
Frank Cooke as King Louis XIII
Jobyna Ralston as Constance Bonne-aux-Fieux

Critical response
On August 28, 1922, The New York Times wrote: ″(...) it is good-natured and lots of fun. If it lacks subtlety and pointed satire, it abounds in broad and whole-hearted mockery. Its method is that of absurdification. Following Fairbanks in the story almost step by step, it parallels, rather than follows him, in its treatment of each incident of the narrative. The Fairbanks version runs along the line of the romantic. The Linder version runs along the line of the ridiculous. (...) It is content to be a burlesque. So you can enjoy both films and neither will impair your enjoyment of the other.″

References

External links 

 
 The Three Must-Get-Theres at SilentEra
 Review, synopsis and link to watch the film: 

1922 films
1920s English-language films
Films directed by Max Linder
American silent feature films
Silent American comedy films
Articles containing video clips
American black-and-white films
Films set in Paris
1920s parody films
United Artists films
Films based on The Three Musketeers
Cultural depictions of Cardinal Richelieu
Cultural depictions of Louis XIII
1922 comedy films
1920s American films
Silent adventure films